IFUSCO (International Finno-Ugric Students' Conference) is an annual international conference for and by the students of Finno-Ugric languages.

IFUSCO conference contains presentations on linguistics, ethnography, folkloristics, archaeology, history, museology, literature, translation theory, sociology, law, music, mythology, regional issues, education, economics etc., that are connected to the lives of speakers of Finno-Ugric languages.

History 
IFUSCO was created in 1984 in Göttingen by local students of Finno-Ugric studies, to facilitate contact between other students. The conference was initially a small gathering that mainly served as a forum and as a way of exchanging information. The first IFUSCO had 26 participants from the Netherlands (Groningen) and Germany (Göttingen, Hamburg). Later it has turned into a conference format where lectures are given by and for students, and every year it is organized in a different city by a different university.

There have been 32 IFUSCOs, as in 2001 the conference was canceled. The first conference on the territory of Russia was held in 1999 in Syktyvkar.

Locations and dates

Göttingen: May 25–27, 1984

Hamburg: 1985

Groningen: 1986

Budapest: May 24–28, 1987

Helsinki: May 22–26, 1988

Vienna: May 14–18, 1989

Tartu: 1990

Greifswald: May 19–23, 1991

Munich: 1992

Prague: 1993

Poznań: 1994

Szeged: 1995

Hamburg: April 24–28, 1996

Turku: May 20–24, 1997

Pécs: May 20–25, 1998

Syktyvkar: May 10–14, 1999

Tallinn: August 3–7, 2000

Helsinki: September 11–15, 2002

Syktyvkar: September 24–26, 2003

Budapest: May 3–8, 2004

Izhevsk: May 12–15, 2005

Yoshkar-Ola: May 12–15, 2006

Saransk: May 15–19, 2007

Helsinki: May 14–18, 2008

Petrozavodsk: May 14–16, 2009

Kudymkar: May 14–16, 2010

Budapest: May 9–11, 2011

Tartu: May 8–11, 2012

Syktyvkar: May 6–8, 2013

Göttingen: April 9–11, 2014

Pécs:  April 16–19, 2015

Helsinki: September 15–18, 2016

Warsaw: September 18-22, 2017

Tartu: May 2-5, 2018

Vienna: April 23-27, 2019

Riga: 2020 (Postponed due to COVID-19) 

Riga: 2021 (Online due to COVID-19) 

Prague: May 23-27, 2022

Emblem 
Every hosting students’ committee is presenting a unique emblem of the year event that serves as a logo for the whole conference.

Conference IFUSCO – 2016 
Originally IFUSCO was supposed to be held in Khanty-Mansiysk on 7–9 April 2016. It was postponed twice before finally being cancelled. However, the Finnish students of Finno-Ugric studies organized its small version at the University of Helsinki in order to keep the tradition.

References

Linguistics conferences
Uralic languages